Thomas Jones (born January 25, 1971) from Lemoore, California is a former American football defensive back who played six seasons in the Arena Football League with the Anaheim Piranhas and San Jose SaberCats. He played college football at California State University, Fresno. He was also a member of the Saskatchewan Roughriders and Amsterdam Admirals.

References

External links
 Just Sports Stats
 Tommy Jones, North Carolina State defensive tackle

Living people
1971 births
Players of American football from California
American football defensive backs
African-American players of American football
Fresno State Bulldogs football players
Saskatchewan Roughriders players
Amsterdam Admirals players
Anaheim Piranhas players
San Jose SaberCats players
People from Lemoore, California
21st-century African-American sportspeople
20th-century African-American sportspeople